Hyangsan County is a kun, or county, in North P'yŏngan province, North Korea.  It was established, following the division of Korea, from portions of Nyŏngbyŏn county. The area of Myohyangsan mountain, which stands on the county's border, has been developed as a tourist destination. Accordingly, there are numerous tourism-related institutions in the Myohangsan area.

Geography
The Myohyangsan and Pinandŏk ranges pass through Hyangsan.  The terrain is primarily mountainous, with numerous peaks. The highest of these is Pirobong.  There are also many streams, of which the chief are the Ch'ŏngch'ŏn and Kuryong Rivers.  Some 77% of the county's area is occupied by forestland. The eastern side of Hyangsan is generally high, while the western side is lower; as one goes from east to west, the elevation of the peaks drops from above 1000 m to less than 300 m.

Administrative divisions
Hyangsan county is divided into 1 ŭp (town) and 20 ri (villages):

Economy
The chief local industry is agriculture, dominated by dry-field farming. The principal crops include maize, rice, and soybeans. In addition, there are also orchards and livestock farms; the chief fruit products are apples and pears. Sericulture is also practised, and there is some manufacturing.

Transportation
The Manp'o Line of the Korean State Railway passes through the county. In addition, there are various roads.

See also
Geography of North Korea
Administrative divisions of North Korea
North Pyongan

Notes

External links
The Hyangsan Bridge 향산다리 360 view 
Hyangsan Hotel 향산호텔 360 view 

Counties of North Pyongan